is a two-part historical and biographical film portraying the turbulent life and times of legendary pan-Asian singer and actress Ri Koran. A tragic figure pitted into the limelight of fame by the unpredictable forces of history, Ri is caught between competing nationalisms and political conflicts, her life and career sculpted by the turbulence of war and global power shifts. Loosely based on Otaka's memoir Ri Kouran wo Ikite: Watashi no Rirekisho, the two-episode film production was directed by Horikawa Tonko and starred Ueto Aya as Ri Koran, first broadcasting in Japan by TV Tokyo on February 11 and 12, 2007. Subtitled versions were subsequently made available online to pan-Asian audiences on major Asian video sharing platforms.

Plot
The film follows Li Xianglan/Ri Koran's life from childhood to adulthood, portraying her tragic identity crisis and internal cross-cultural conflict. Born Yoshiko Yamaguchi in 1920 to well-educated Japanese expatriates in increasingly Japanese-dominated northeastern China, she was raised in a multi-ethnic, transnational social circle consisting of various Chinese, Japanese and European acquaintances, many of whom hail from an intellectual or artistic background. The film details her friendship with Lyuba Monosova Gurinets, the daughter of a Russian aristocratic family exiled by the 1917 Revolution and learned music from the Italian soprano Madam Podresov, who was married into exiled Russian aristocracy.
 
Her father was an expert in Chinese history and literature, and belonged to a group of transnational Japanese intellectuals who wanted to build a pan-Asian utopia through Sino-Japanese cooperation. While her family was very fond and close to Chinese culture, as a child, she witnesses the brutalities of Japanese colonialism and imperialism against Chinese people firsthand, epitomized in a violent scene where her friendly Chinese neighbour was tied to a tree and bloodily beaten by Japanese soldiers for suspected anti-Japanese activities. These traumatic episodes cause her to internalize her Japanese heritage as a marker of oppression, inducing guilt in the young child.
 
In 1931, Japan invades northeastern China and establishes the pro-Japanese puppet state Manchukuo. At this time, Yoshiko was enrolled in a Beijing high school under the Chinese name Pan Shuhua, and was assumed to be Chinese by most of her peers. At a student gathering passionately denouncing Japanese aggression, Shuhua was asked what she would do if Japanese troops reached Beijing. She replies, "I want to stand atop Beijing's city walls and have bullets pierce through my body." Her classmates enthusiastically applaud her, assuming she meant she would use her own body to defend Beijing against Japanese invasion. However, as visually represented through a fiery dream sequence where Chinese and Japanese bullets shatter her from both sides, she was really expressing her helplessness in being caught in the crossfires of two nations she loved dearly.
 
As she blossoms into a beautiful young lady, the Manchukuo Film Association, or Man'ei for short, recruits her, and she swiftly rises to fame as a popular singer and film actress. She uses the Chinese name Li Xianglan or its Japanese pronunciation equivalent Ri Koran as her stage name during the Manchukuo era. However, in that highly politicized era, becoming a pop cultural icon entailed becoming a propaganda tool for powerful forces beyond Li Xianglan's control. Li stars in many Man'ei films that promoted Manchukuo's official ideology and multiethnic unity policy. Li's rise to fame is one of the most successful projects that sought to embody the theme of ethnic harmony in Man'ei films. She represents the pan-Asian imaginary rather than a fixed singular ethnic figure, typically involving a non-Japanese female character falling in love with a Japanese male. She is named the "Goodwill Ambassador for Manchukuo-Japanese Friendship," a title she cherished and truly believed in. However, even as a renowned celebrity, she faces racism; on a trip to Japan, Li is dressed in a qipao, and is stopped by a Japanese soldier. Upon checking her papers, the soldier angrily reprimands and insults her, shouting that a superior Japanese should not wear the fashion of the inferior races. These episodes slowly make Li realize the hypocrisy of the official rhetoric, and she feels guilty of representing propaganda characters.

The war draws to a close with Japan's defeat and the collapse of Manchukuo. Li (despite having faced racial discrimination on her trip to Japan) is arrested in Shanghai and charged with treason against China. As tensions rise between the Kuomintang and the Communists, she is scheduled to be put to death by firing squad. Dissatisfied with their daughter's upcoming execution, her parents (at the time both under arrest in Beijing) decide to produce a copy of her birth certificate proving Li is actually an ethnic Japanese by the name of "Yoshiko Yamaguchi" and have Lyuba smuggle it into Shanghai. After the Chinese authorities discover her true identity, all treason charges are dismissed and she is immediately repatriated to Japan. The film then fast forwards to the late 1990s, when Sino-Japanese relations have normalized, and Li, by then Yoshiko Otaka (a name which she acquired through her marriage to diplomat Hiroshi Otaka), is able to revisit the land of her childhood. In a cemetery, she runs into her childhood friend Lyuba, and the film closes with the two having an emotional reunion.

Cast
 Ueto Aya as Ri Kouran/Yamaguchi Yoshiko/Pan Shuhua/Otaka Yoshiko
 Hashizume Isao as Yamaguchi Fumio (Yoshiko's father)
 Natori Yuko as Yamaguchi Ai (Yoshiko's mother)
 Kikukawa Rei as Kawashima Yoshiko/Jin Bihui/Princess Dongzhen
 Nakamura Shido as Amakasu Masahiko
 Sawamura Ikki as Kawakita Nagamasa
 Yukiyoshi Ozawa as Kodama Hidemi
 Ono Takehiko as Yamaga Toru
 Nakamura Fukusuke as Hasegawa Kazuo
 Kaneda Akio as Azuma Keizo
 Tsuruta Shinobu as Uchida Tomu
 Nishida Ken as Lt. Gen. Yoshioka Yasunao
 Nakayama Megumi as Chen Yunshang
 Saito Yoichiro as Tamura Taijiro
 Fukami Motoki as Matsuoka Kenichiro
 Ishibashi Tamotsu as Noguchi Hisamitsu
 Maeda Koyo as Hattori Ryoichi
 Kawamata Shinobu as Atsumi Masako
 Noda Yoshiko as Kawakita Kashiko
 Honda Shinya as Tsuji Kyuichi
 Yoshimitsu Ryota as Koide Takashi
 Saito Satoru as Yamanashi Minoru
 Tokui Yuu as Makino Mitsuo
 Matsuzawa Kazuyuki as Ueno Shinji
 Suzuki Masayuki as Watanabe Kunio
 Ayata Toshiki as Police Capt. Kanazawa
 Ishii Hideaki as Negishi Kanichi
 Saito Bunta as Ikeda Sentaro
 Taguchi Shusho as Kume Masao
 Koike Ayame as Young Yoshiko
 Nogiwa Yōko as Narrator / Present-day Otaka Yoshiko
 Wang Weihua as Emperor Puyi
 Li Lin as Empress Wanrong
 Feng Minmin as Miss Liu
 Yao Keqin as Li Jichun
 Wang Min as Pan Yugui
 Lu Xiaolin as Wen Guihua
 Lu Yijun as Meng Hong

Reception
The film received TV Tokyo's average viewership rates of 9.1% for Ep. 1 and 8.5% for Ep. 2

References

2000 films
2000s historical films
Biographical films about actors
Biographical films about singers
2000s Japanese-language films
Japanese historical films
Films based on Japanese novels
Films shot in Tokyo
Second Sino-Japanese War films
Films set in the 1930s
Cultural depictions of Chinese women
Cultural depictions of actors
Cultural depictions of folk musicians
2000s Japanese films